This is a list of the extreme points of Ukraine: the points that are farther north, south, east or west than any other location, as well as the highest and lowest points in the country.

Extreme coordinates

 North extreme: 52°22'46"N, 33°11'28"E is located near village of Hremyach in Chernihiv Oblast.
 West extreme: 48°25'06"N, 22°08'13"E is located near Chop, town in Zakarpattia Oblast.
 East extreme: 49°15'38"N, 40°13'40"E is located near Rannya Zorya, village in Luhansk Oblast.
 South extreme (with Crimea): 44°23'11N, 33°46'38"E is located in Foros in Crimea.

Elevation extremes
 Highest point: 2,061 m on Hoverla mountain in Carpathian Mountains.
 Lowest: -5 m on Kuyalnik Estuary near Odesa.

See also
 Geography of Ukraine

Ukraine
Borders of Ukraine
Extreme